, also known as Ishikinawa Castle, is a Ryukyuan gusuku in Kumejima, Okinawa, on Kume Island. It was built on a cliff to control the Shirase River.

References

Castles in Okinawa Prefecture
Kumejima, Okinawa